Hynson, is an unincorporated community on Maryland's Eastern Shore in Caroline County, Maryland, United States. The earliest record of its existence is from the 1875 Map of Caroline County, where it is referred to as  Newhope. In the 1897 Map of Caroline County, it is referred to as Hynson. The Hynson Post Office was located there, which operated from 1881 to 1907.

References

Unincorporated communities in Caroline County, Maryland
Unincorporated communities in Maryland